Bloody Falls (or Bloody Fall, or Kogluktok, meaning "it flows rapidly" or "spurts like a cut artery" in Inuktitut) is a waterfall on the Coppermine River, in the Kugluk/Bloody Falls Territorial Park of Nunavut, Canada. It was the site of the Bloody Falls Massacre in 1771 and the murder of two priests by Copper Inuit Uloqsaq and Sinnisiak in 1913.

Historically, this area was occupied by the Kogluktogmiut subgroup of Copper Inuit.

In 1978, the portion of the Territorial Park northwest of the Coppermine River was designated the Bloody Falls National Historic Site of Canada, as the archaeological remains of pre-contact hunting and fishing sites in the area form a record of the presence of Pre-Dorset, Thule, First Nation and Inuit peoples over the last 3000 years.

References

National Historic Sites in Nunavut
Waterfalls of Nunavut